Dirt is the second novel in the Stone Barrington series by Stuart Woods.

It was first published in 1996 by HarperCollins. The novel takes place in New York, a few years after the events in New York Dead. The novel continues the story of Stone Barrington, a retired detective turned lawyer/private investigator

External links
Stuart Woods website

1996 American novels
American thriller novels
Novels set in New York City
HarperCollins books